Lobular carcinoma is a form of tumor which primarily affects the lobules of a gland.

It is sometimes considered equivalent to "terminal duct carcinoma".

If not otherwise specified, it generally refers to breast cancer. Examples include:
 Lobular carcinoma in situ
 Invasive lobular carcinoma

References

External links 

Carcinoma